Taquipirenda Airport  is a public-use airstrip serving the Taquipirenda gas pipeline facility in the Santa Cruz Department of Bolivia.

See also

Transport in Bolivia
List of airports in Bolivia

References

External links 
OpenStreetMap - Taquipirenda
OurAirports - Taquipirenda
Fallingrain - Taquipirenda Airport

Bolivian gas pipeline system

Airports in Santa Cruz Department (Bolivia)